The 2022 census of Ireland was held on Sunday, 3 April 2022. It was organised by the Central Statistics Office (CSO) and reported a total population of 5,123,536, or a 7.6% increase since the prior 2016 census. It is the highest population recorded in a census since 1841 and the first time the population exceeded five million since 1851.

A census was originally planned for 18 April 2021, but was postponed due to the COVID-19 pandemic.

Background
On 15 September 2020, the Irish government postponed the planned 2021 census on advice from the CSO, citing concerns for public health, the health of CSO staff, and the census response rate, all pertaining to the COVID-19 pandemic in Ireland.

The CSO hired 5,100 enumerators, supported by 466 field supervisors, who reported in turn to 46 regional supervisors.

Census form
Preparation of the 2022 census form began in 2017 with a public consultation process drawing input from various governmental departments, interest groups, and academics. The consultation was organised by the Census Advisory Group between October and November 2017, assessing over 400 submissions which informed a test survey of revised and new questions in September 2018. The consultation process led to the inclusion of 8 new questions, which covered topics like ownership of renewable energy sources, working from home, and smoking habits. Additionally, all 25 questions used in the 2016 and 2011 censuses were revised.

The 2022 form was also the first to include a 'time capsule' section, offering a space for respondents to write a voluntary message to remain sealed for 100 years due to data protection requirements.

In February 2021, the CSO confirmed it was researching possible questions to record gender identities, but that no such question would appear on the 2022 census form, which will only ask respondents for their sex with the options 'male' or 'female'. The decision was criticised by multiple LGBT groups and advocates.

Results 
The preliminary results were released on 23 June 2022, showing a national population of 5,123,536.

Population by county and region

See also
 Census tract
 Demographics of the Republic of Ireland
 Irish population analysis

References 

2022 in the Republic of Ireland
2022 censuses
Censuses in the Republic of Ireland
Demographics of Ireland
Geographic history of Ireland